Razdrto is a small settlement north of Gorenja Brezovica in the Municipality of Šentjernej in southeastern Slovenia. The municipality is part of the traditional region of Lower Carniola. It is now included in the Southeast Slovenia Statistical Region.

References

External links
Razdrto on Geopedia

Populated places in the Municipality of Šentjernej